Fernando Alarza (born 23 March 1991) is a Spanish triathlete. He competed in the men's event at the 2016 Summer Olympics. In 2015 he was part of ECS Triathlon team.

References

External links
 

1991 births
Living people
Spanish male triathletes
Olympic triathletes of Spain
Triathletes at the 2016 Summer Olympics
People from Talavera de la Reina
Sportspeople from the Province of Toledo
European Games competitors for Spain
Triathletes at the 2015 European Games
Triathletes at the 2020 Summer Olympics